Fred Avril Magnon (born 1974) is a French composer based in Montmartre, Paris.
As a singer, songwriter, and multi-instrumentalist, he won international praise for two albums that showed a strong link with cinema.

Biography 
Avril got his start in film music in 2008 with Hong-Kong acclaimed director Johnnie To. His quasi-musical Man Jeuk's soundtrack was nominated at both the Hong Kong Film Awards and Golden Horse Film Festival and Awards, the film being a box-office hit in China. 
Fred Avril won the Stockholm Music Award with Swedish film Sound of Noise (Semaine de la critique, Cannes) about "sonic bombing". He then composed the score for the indie feature "The Lifeguard" (Liz W. Garcia) with Kristen Bell, that premiered in Sundance.

Other projects featured singers Mick Harvey (former member of the Bad Seeds) and late Christophe (singer). He co-composed with Marianne Elise the song in French box-office success Connasse, Princesse des cœurs introducing Camille Cottin.

In 2018, he composed the main theme for The Hook Up Plan. The music was uploaded by fans on YouTube and was streamed more than 5 million times throughout the world before being released by Bertelsmann Music Group.
Avril also writes orchestral music, such as I Am Not an Easy Man.
He won the Emile Award for Best Soundtrack for an Animated Series with adult manga series Lastman.

Cinema and series 

 2007 : Part of The Mad Detective film directed by Johnnie To
 2008 : Sparrow co-composition film directed by Johnnie To (Premiered in Berlin International Film Festival 2008)
 2010 : Sound of Noise Swedish film by Johannes Stjärne Nilsson and Ola Simonsson (Premiered in Cannes Semaine de la critique 2010)
 2011 : Attraction de Kōji Morimoto avec Danger, INPI (interactive manga)
 2012 : Les Voies impénétrables french TV film Maxime Govare and Noémie Saglio, Canal+ 
 2013 : The Lifeguard US film directed by Liz W. Garcia with Kristen Bell, Martin Starr (Premiered in Sundance 2013)
 2014 : Les Amis à vendre, TV movie, play by Gabor Rassov filmed for Arte by Belgian director Gaetan Bevernaege starring Didier Bénureau and Romane Bohringer (Arte)
 2015: Les Bêtises film directed by Alice and Rose Philippon with Jérémie Elkaïm, Sara Giraudeau, Jonathan Lambert, Anne Alvaro, Jacques Weber - End titles song performed by Christophe.
 2015 : Connasse, princesse des cœurs, French film directed by Noémie Saglio and Éloïse Lang with Camille Cottin.
 2015: Rain, short movie directed by Johannes Stjärne Nilsson with Sally Phillips (premiered at Seattle International Film Festival)
 2016 : Jukai, animated short movie directed by Gabrielle Lissot (Best Foreign Movie at Hong Kong International Film Festival 2016)
 2016 : Anissa 2002 directed by Fabienne Facco
 2017 : Lastman, 26 episodes animated series directed by Jérémie Périn - (original comic by Bastien Vivès, Balak and Michaël Sanlaville (Premiered in Annecy 2017).
 2018 : Larguées directed by Eloïse Lang with Camille Cottin (Premiered in Alpe d'Huez).
 2018 : I Am Not an Easy Man directed by Eleonore Pourriat - Netflix Original, produced in the US.
 2018 : The Hook Up Plan, french series Netflix Original produced in France.
 2019 : Pearl directed by Elsa Amiel starring Peter Mullan (Premiered in Europe at Venice Days 2018 and in the US at Tribeca 2019)
 2019 : Qui m'aime me suive film by José Alcala with Daniel Auteuil - End titles song performed by Mick Harvey.
 2020 : Brazen feminist animated series directed by Charlotte Cambon and Phuong Mai Nguyen, starring Cécile de France - original comic by Pénélope Bagieu (premiered in San Diego Comic-Con 2019).
 2020 : Un Triomphe directed by Emmanuel Courcol.

Discography

Personal albums 
 Now It's Spring (2000) (F Com)
 That Horse Must Be Starving (2002) (F Com)
 Members Only (2004) (F Com)

Original soundtracks 
 Sparrow (CD, Naive 2008)
 Sound of Noise (CD, Hybris, 2010)
 Les Bêtises Cine Music Club (2014)
 Connasse, Princesse des Coeurs (CD, Milan, 2015)
 Lastman (Vinyl, Everybody On Deck, 2017) (sold out)
 I Am Not an Easy Man (Plaza Mayor, 2018)
 Pearl (Plaza Mayor, 2019)
 Qui m'aime me suive (Plaza Mayor, 2019)
 Plan Coeur (BMG US, 2019)

Other records 
 Hollywood mon amour (« This Is Not America » cover featuring Juliette Lewis) (PIAS 2008)
 Nouvelle Vague Album Bande à part arrangement and production (Peacefrog 2006)
 Temposhark Invisible Ink Remix (Paper and Glue 2005)
 Olga Kouklaki, I U Need arrangement and production (EMI 2011)
 Stephan Eicher, L'Envolée composition and production p(Barclay/Universal, 2012)

Distinctions 

 Prix Constantin 2002 French equivalent of the Mercury Prize
 Nominations for Johnnie To's Sparrow at Hong Kong International Film Festival and Taipei Film Festival.
 Won the Stockholm Film Festival Music Award for Sound of Noise in 2010. « With great innovation and skill, the score elevates the story to becoming a unique, entertaining and magical film » 
 Won the Emile Award 2018 for best soundtrack in an animated series in Europe with Lastman

References

External links
http://www.fred-avril.com
http://www.residentadvisor.net/review-view.aspx?id=1981
http://www.rfimusique.com/musiquefr/articles/060/article_12960.asp

French electronic musicians
People from Agen
Living people
1974 births